Structured data analysis may refer to:

Structured data analysis (statistics) – the search for structure in a dataset
Structured data analysis (systems analysis) – a project management technique
Structured data mining  – a machine learning and data analysis technique